The 1930 Calgary municipal election was held on November 19, 1930 to elect a Commissioner and six Aldermen to sit on Calgary City Council. Along with positions on Calgary City Council, three trustees for the Public School Board, two trustees for the Separate School Board, and five questions put before the voters.

Calgary City Council governed under "Initiative, Referendum and Recall" which is composed of a Mayor, Commissioner and twelve Aldermen all elected to staggered two year terms. Mayor Andrew Davison and six Aldermen: Robert Henry Parkyn, Robert Henry Weir, Pansy Louise Pue, Joseph Hope Ross, Samuel Stanley Savage, and Jean Romeo Cyr-Miquelon elected in 1929 continued in their positions.

Background
The election was held under the Single Transferable Voting/Proportional Representation (STV/PR) with the term for candidates being two years.

Aldermanic candidate from East Calgary, William Cummins (1890-1933) nomination papers were refused owing to an ordinance adopted in 1893 which prohibited the proprietor of a saloon or licensed premises from contesting any civic office. Cummins was the owner of the Shamrock Hotel which included a licensed bar. After obtaining legal advice, Cummins withdrew his nomination.

Results

Commissioner

Council
Quota for election was 1,942.

Public School Board
The quota was 3,053

Separate school board

Plebiscites

25th avenue bridge
25th Avenue Bridge for $130,000. Approval requires two-thirds majority.
For - 3,080
Against - 3,681

Swimming pools
Construction of three swimming pools for $90,000. Approval requires two-thirds majority.
For - 3,283
Against - 3,485

Nurses's home
Nurses home for $60,000. Approval requires two-thirds majority.
For - 2,309
Against - 4,385

Payment of Aldermen
Salaries for Aldermen of $300 per year. Approval requires two-thirds majority.
For - 4,000
Against - 7,977

Firemen's hours
Firemen's hours providing one day off per week. Approval requires two-thirds majority. The proposition failed for the second year in a row.
For - 5,217
Against - 6,827

See also
List of Calgary municipal elections

References

1930s in Calgary
Municipal elections in Calgary
1930 elections in Canada